Eubranchus vittatus is a species of sea slug or nudibranch, a marine gastropod mollusc in the family Eubranchidae.

Description
(Original description) The colour of the slender body of the snail is pale buff speckled with fawn-colour. Its head is rather large and truncated in front. The dorsal tentaculaare  slightly conical, wrinkled, fawn-coloured, with pale tips. The oral tentacula are rather shorter than the dorsal ones and of the same colour. The branchiae are somewhat clavate, long, with obtuse terminations, very pale fawn-coloured, with three darker bands of the same colour. They are set in six or seven distant rows down the sides, largest in front, four to seven in each row.

Distribution
This species was described from deep water, off Cullercoats, England. It has been reported from the Atlantic coasts of Europe from Norway south to Galicia, Spain.

References

 Picton B.E. & Morrow C.C., 1994: A Field Guide to the Nudibranchs of the British Isles; Immel Publishing LtId., London.
 Gofas, S.; Le Renard, J.; Bouchet, P. (2001). Mollusca. in: Costello, M.J. et al. (Ed.) (2001). European register of marine species: a check-list of the marine species in Europe and a bibliography of guides to their identification. Collection Patrimoines Naturels. 50: pp. 180–213

Eubranchidae
Gastropods described in 1842